Christine Williams may refer to:
Christine Williams (model) (born 1945), English model and actor
Christine Williams (nutritionist), English professor and university pro-vice-chancellor
Christine Williams (sociologist), American sociologist
Christine Williams (Tangle), fictional character on Tangle
Christine Blair, née Christine Williams, fictional character on The Young and the Restless
Chrissie Williams, Christine Williams, a fictional character on Holby City

See also
Chris Williams (disambiguation)
Christina Williams, American murder victim